Mariya Dolgopolova (born  in Kharkiv) is a Ukrainian short track speed skater.

She began training in 2009 in Kharkiv, Ukraine. A friend invited her to try the sport. She enjoys it because of its speed and close contact. Dolgopolova competed at the 2012 Winter Youth Olympics for Ukraine. In the event she was 7th in 500 m event, didn't finish in 1000 m and won silver in mixed team relay.

References 

1997 births
Living people
Ukrainian female short track speed skaters
Sportspeople from Kharkiv
Short track speed skaters at the 2012 Winter Youth Olympics